Rhodes Memorial Hall, commonly known as Rhodes Hall, is an historic house located in Atlanta, Georgia, United States. It was built as the home of furniture magnate Amos Giles Rhodes, proprietor of Atlanta-based Rhodes Furniture. The Romanesque Revival house occupies a prominent location on Peachtree Street, the main street of Atlanta, and is listed in the National Register of Historic Places. It is open to the public and has been the home of The Georgia Trust for Historic Preservation since 1983.

Inspiration
Rhodes Hall is a Romanesque Revival  house inspired by the Rhineland castles that Rhodes admired on a trip to Europe in the late 1890s. Architect Willis F. Denny designed the unique home with Stone Mountain granite, incorporating medieval Romanesque, Victorian, and Arts and Crafts designs as well as necessary adaptations for an early 20th-century home.  After two years of construction, the house was completed in 1904.

Victorian architecture
Known as Le Rêve ("The Dream"), Rhodes Hall is one of the finest intact expressions of medievalism and late Victorian architectural design in Atlanta. The grandest feature of the interior is a magnificent series of stained and painted glass windows that rise above a carved mahogany staircase.  The three-panel series depicts the rise and fall of the Confederacy from Fort Sumter to Appomattox, and includes medallion portraits of over a dozen Confederates. These confederate officers include ardent opponents of reconstruction (Robert Toombs, 1810–1885), a Grand Wizard of the Ku Klux Klan (Nathan Bedford Forrest, 1821–1877), and the head of the Ku Klux Klan in the State of Georgia (John B. Gordon, 1832–1904).

Characteristics
The house cost Rhodes $50,000 to build in 1904. Wired for electricity when it was built, Rhodes Hall is a prime example of the fascination that new technology held for Atlantans at the turn of the century. Over 300 light bulbs light the entire house. The house also had electric call buttons in most rooms as well as a security system.

Although Rhodes Hall is now surrounded by commercial buildings and heavy traffic, it has survived damage due to careful historic preservation and restoration efforts.  After the death of Rhodes and his wife, their children deeded the house to the U.S. state of Georgia, with a restriction that it be used for "historic purposes". State historian Ruth Blair moved the Georgia Department of Archives and History to the house, and lived in the house as well. It was used to house the Georgia State Archives from 1930 to 1965. After the Archives moved to a more modern building, Rhodes Hall continued to provide archive services as a branch.

In 1983 Rhodes Hall was transferred to the Georgia Trust for Historic Preservation, which undertook a long-term restoration program. The main stair and windows, which had been moved to the new Archives, were brought back and re-installed in 1990.

From 1984 to 1992, the house was a haunted house attraction every year for Halloween, prior to renovation and conversion to a museum.

House museum
Rhodes Hall is used as both an event space and as the offices of the Georgia Trust for Historic Preservation. There are house tours on Saturdays (from 10 - 2, the last tour starts at 1) and group tours can be given on other days with advance arrangement. Rhodes Hall is also available for rentals including weddings, receptions, corporate events, cocktail gatherings, and birthday parties.

Rhodes Center

In 1937, the Rhodes Center, Atlanta's first shopping center, was built on the north, west and south sides of Rhodes Hall (photo, p.5). Only the south building remains.

See also
Rhodes–Haverty Building

References

External links

 Rhodes Memorial Hall at Georgia Trust for Historic Preservation
 Fulton County listings at National Register of Historic Places
 Rhodes Memorial Hall, National Park Service Atlanta
 Rhodes Memorial Hall, Atlanta Urban Design Commission

Houses completed in 1904
Houses in Atlanta
Romanesque Revival architecture in Georgia (U.S. state)
Historic house museums in Georgia (U.S. state)
Museums in Atlanta
Willis F. Denny buildings
National Register of Historic Places in Atlanta
Houses on the National Register of Historic Places in Georgia (U.S. state)
1904 establishments in Georgia (U.S. state)